Lakeland Linder International Airport  is a public airport five miles southwest of Lakeland, in Polk County, Florida. The Federal Aviation Administration (FAA) National Plan of Integrated Airport Systems for 2017–2021 categorized it as a national reliever facility for Tampa International Airport. The airport has a Class 1 Federal Aviation Regulation (FAR) Part 139 operating certificate allowing passenger airline flights.

Annually, around March–April, the airport hosts the Sun 'n Fun Aerospace Expo, a six-day fly-in, airshow and aviation convention. It is the second largest such event in the United States after the Experimental Aircraft Association's (EAA) annual "AirVenture" event each summer at Wittman Regional Airport (OSH) in Oshkosh, Wisconsin.

The airport is home to the southeast regional air cargo hub for Amazon Air, which started operations at the airport in July 2020.

History

 For the original Lakeland Municipal Airport, see Lodwick Field

In 1940 the Lakeland City Commission passed a resolution to replace the city's Lakeland Municipal Airport, which was built in 1933 and early 1934. The new airport, tentatively named Lakeland Municipal Airport No. 2, was named Drane Field in honor of Herbert J. Drane, one of Lakeland's outstanding citizens.

The city had barely begun work on the new airport when, with the war already raging in Europe, it leased the facility to the War Department. The U.S. Army Corps of Engineers improved the three existing runways and built a training facility for bombers and fighters. The new base, initially a sub-base of MacDill Field in Tampa, was named Lakeland Army Air Field, but was still known as Drane Field. Thousands of U.S. Army Air Forces pilots, navigators, bombardiers and flight crew received part of their advanced flight training at Lakeland during World War II, primarily in the B-26 Marauder.   After the war ended, the Army Airfield was left unused due to the size of the facility far exceeding the needs of the city as well as the costs involved of converting it to civil use.

By the 1950s, Lakeland Municipal Airport (renamed Al Lodwick Field in 1948) was dwindling due to the closure of Lodwick Aircraft, the airport's primary tenant. With the closure of Lodwick Aircraft, the city decided to phase out Lodwick Field as a municipal airport in the summer of 1957 and concentrate its resources on Drane Field in south Lakeland. Drane Field had deteriorated and languished underutilized for many years following the departure of the U.S. Army Air Forces in 1945. After several years of new construction and conversion to a civil airport, it was rededicated as Lakeland Municipal Airport in 1960 with Don Emerson as its first director.

In the 1970s the facility was renamed Lakeland Regional Airport; in the late 1980s it was again renamed as Lakeland Linder Regional Airport for local businessman Paul Scott Linder. Linder had founded Lakeland-based Linder Industrial Machinery, a multimillion-dollar heavy construction machinery company, in 1953. The Chairman of the Lakeland Economic Development Council, Linder was also director of the Florida Council of 100, the Florida Chamber of Commerce and the Florida Council of Economic Education. He was named Florida's Free Enterpriser of the Year in 1988, received a Distinguished Alumnus Award from the University of Florida, and was named 1989 Florida Entrepreneur of the Year. Paul Scott Linder died on November 11, 1990.

In November 2017 Lakeland Linder International Airport opened their first U.S. Customs and Border Protection General Aviation Facility allowing international aircraft with 20 passengers or fewer to land at the field with an approved overflight permit.

In 2020 the airport had 115,628 aircraft operations, averaging 317 per day: 97% general aviation, 2% military, 1% air taxi, and <1% airline. In December 2020, 279 aircraft were based at the airport: 161 single-engine, 35 multi-engine, 42 jet, 9 helicopter, and 1 glider.

Commercial air service 

With the impending closure of Lodwick Field, National Airlines (1934–1980) moved their Lodestars to Drane Field in 1947; the airline left the airport in 1962.

During the 1960s and into the early 1970s, prior to airline deregulation, airline service was provided by Allegheny Commuter and the former Sun Airlines.

Allegheny Commuter arrived in Lakeland on February 22, 1979. This was after The Deregulation Act of 1978. Chautauqua Airlines of Jamestown, NY provided the service under the Allegheny Commuter affiliation with USAir. The service provided 5 roundtrips a day to Orlando (MCO), using 15-passenger Beech 99s. Due to low demand, the flights ended September 15, 1980.

From 2006 to 2008 the airport had limited air service under FAR Part 135 (AirTaxi) provided by DayJet utilizing Eclipse 500 very light jet (VLJ) aircraft. DayJet also maintained a "DayPort" facility in the airport's main terminal building. DayJet ceased operations in September 2008 and subsequently declared bankruptcy.

Scheduled airline flights returned to the airport in June 2011, when Direct Air flying Boeing 737s began service to Myrtle Beach, SC; Niagara Falls, NY, and Springfield, IL. Service ended on March 13, 2012, when Direct Air unexpectedly announced an end to operations. Direct Air was then subject to Chapter 7 liquidation on April 12, 2012.

On July 23, 2020, Amazon Air commenced operations following the opening of a brand new 285,000 square foot cargo processing facility. Its flights at Lakeland Linder International are operated by Air Transport International and Sun Country Airlines.

Cargo airlines

Federal government, corporate and business aviation 
The airport hosts 84 businesses and organizations that employ over 3,494 people. Through the combination of aircraft operations and local businesses, the airport has an economic impact of over $1.5 billion (in 2021). For the last three years, there was an average of $77 million in capital projects per year, accounting for 596 jobs.

The National Oceanic and Atmospheric Administration′s (NOAA) Aircraft Operations Center (AOC) relocated to Lakeland from MacDill Air Force Base in June 2017. NOAA AOC is the headquarters for all nine research aircraft operated by NOAA, including their world-famous NOAA Hurricane Hunters (WP-3D Orion aircraft).

In addition, a defense contractor, Draken International, is headquartered at the airport. Draken provides training support to the US Military with their fleet of privately owned tactical aircraft, which includes Douglas A-4 Skyhawk, Mikoyan-Gurevich MiG-21, Aermacchi MB-339, Aero L-39 Albatros, and Dassault Mirage F1, the Atlas Cheetah, and the Aero L-159 Alca aircraft.

One of the airport's fixed base operators, Sheltair Aviation, services private and general aviation aircraft. The company also recently entered a partnership with Sun 'n Fun with a percentage of their fuel sales supporting aviation education.

The airport will soon receive its newest and second fixed base operator, Aero Center Lakeland. The facility will include new hangars for maintenance and storage (a 10,000 sq ft and 15,000 sq ft hangar), a 50,000-gallon fuel farm (5,000 sq ft), and a general aviation terminal (11,000 sq ft) along with a 120,000 sq ft ramp.

The airport's newest tenant, Amazon Air, completed construction of their southeast regional air cargo hub in July 2020. Initially, Amazon Air leased 47 acres of a 110-acre parcel and will soon be expanding onto the adjacent parcel. Aircraft currently serving Amazon Air include the Boeing 737 Next Generation and the Boeing 767.

Military 

From the 1970s until 2001, the airfield was a joint civil-military facility when it hosted Army Aviation Support Facility #2 of the Florida Army National Guard, operating since-retired UH-1 Huey helicopters, followed by the locally based UH-60L Blackhawk helicopters of Detachment D, 171st Aviation Battalion (TA). This unit was later redesignated Bravo Company, 1st Battalion, 171st Aviation Regiment (Co B/1-171 AVN), augmented by Detachment 1, Hotel Company, 1st Battalion, 171st Aviation Regiment Det 1-H Co/1-171 AVN) flying two C-23 Sherpa aircraft. The establishment of these units and aircraft in Lakeland was due primarily to the efforts of former U.S. Senator and later Governor of Florida, Lawton Chiles (D-FL), a Lakeland native. In 2001, the Florida Army National Guard aviation units relocated to a new facility at Brooksville-Tampa Bay Regional Airport in Brooksville, Florida.

Despite the military's departure from Lakeland Linder International Airport, Florida Army National Guard aircraft, as well as Air Force aircraft from MacDill AFB, Coast Guard aircraft from CGAS Clearwater, Army Reserve aircraft from the Army Aviation Support Facility at St. Petersburg-Clearwater International Airport, U.S. Navy aircraft from Pensacola, and other transient military aircraft throughout the United States continue to use the airfield for practice approaches, landings, and takeoffs. The airport's principal fixed-base operator (FBO) also continues to provide DoD contract jet fuel services for transient military aircraft.

Education 

LAL is host to Central Florida Aerospace Academy, a public high school with over 250 students. The academy, part of the Polk County Public Schools, maintains four tracks that students can follow throughout their high school career, including A&P, Aerospace, Avionics, and Engineering.

LAL also hosts the Lakeland Aero-Club, which is the largest high school flying club in the nation. The club builds and restores vintage aircraft, promotes flight training to its members, and flies to Oshkosh, Wisconsin "Airventure" annually in all antique airplanes providing members with cross-country flight training.

In addition, the airport hosts two colleges (Polk State College) and Southeastern University (Florida), as well as a career college (Travis Technical College). Polk State has over 240 students between their four-degree programs (Aerospace Administration, Aerospace Sciences, Aviation Maintenance Administration, and Professional Pilot Science). PSC is the only public college offering bachelor's degrees in Aerospace in the state of Florida. Southeastern University offers an accelerated and affordable flight training program while attending classes. Travis Technical College allows students to obtain their A&P license after high school.

Facilities

Over the years the airport has seen a number of layout modifications. Runway 10/28, its associated taxiway system, and the current airport terminal ramp area can accommodate up to Boeing 747 and 777 aircraft.

The Lakeland VORTAC is on the airfield and runways 10/28 and 5/23 have high-intensity runway lighting (HIRL) and P4L precision approach path indicator (PAPI) systems. Runway 10 is equipped with a Category II/III Instrument Landing System (ILS), and High Intensity Approach Light System with Sequenced Flashers (ALSF-2). In addition, runways 5/23 and 28 have published non-precision approaches. The airport has been a tower-controlled airport since the 1970s and the FAA operates a Level I air traffic control tower under the FAA Contract Tower Program. The FAA also installed an Automatic Dependent Surveillance-Broadcast (ADS-B) ground station at the airport.

Emergency services are provided by the Lakeland Fire Department, which maintains a 24-hour staffed station on the airfield with a specialized crash truck and crew providing aircraft rescue and firefighting (ARFF) capability. The airport maintains ARFF Index B and is capable of meeting Index C with prior notice.

The main terminal building contains the airport administrative offices, passenger processing area, passenger waiting areas, and a restaurant. A Hilton Hotels Corporation Hilton Garden Inn is located adjacent to the terminal. A Staybridge Suites extended stay hotel became the second hotel at the Lakeland Airport, which opened in December 2017 and sits on 2.18 acres next to the Hilton Garden Inn. This new lodging accommodates the expansion of nearby corporate parks, distribution centers, and the increasing capacity of the airport facilities. The restaurant, Waco Kitchen, which is based out of Battle Creek, Michigan is considered “farm to table,” meaning that the ingredients served are locally sourced.

With a growing demand from international operators the airport began planning and design of a new U.S. Customs and Border Protection General Aviation Facility (User Fee Facility) in 2015. With the opening of its customs office in 2017, LAL is now capable of accepting an array of international flights.

See also 
 List of airports in Florida
 South Lakeland Airport

References

External links

 
 Lakeland Linder International Airport Master Plan Update - Lakeland Airport
 Sky King Gets Lakeland Move Under Way - The Ledger (April 30, 2010)
  brochure from CFASPP
 Aerial image as of January 1999 from USGS The National Map
 
 
 Hallback's Bar & Grill
 PilotMall.com
 Airportag.com
 

Airports in Polk County, Florida
Airports established in 1942
Buildings and structures in Lakeland, Florida
1942 establishments in Florida